The "Dnipro-1" Regiment is a Special Tasks Patrol Police regiment subordinated to Ministry of Internal Affairs of Ukraine. The regiment is based in Dnipro.

The Dnipro-1 was one the first official Ukrainian volunteer battalions to be created.

History 
The unit was first established as "Dnipro-1" Special Tasks Patrol Police Battalion in April 2014 on a voluntary basis as the response to 2014 pro-Russian unrest in Ukraine. Its assignments included duties at multiple checkpoints in the south-eastern part of Ukraine. The unit claimed to have hired Romanian and Georgian military advisers to help with the training of troops. Before June 2014 this training was often just one week. It first operated outside Dnipropetrovsk Oblast in May 2014.

The militia unit, nicknamed Kolomoyskyi's battalion, was funded by the Ministry of Internal Affairs of Ukraine and also through the charitable organization "Fund Dnipro-1". Ukrainian oligarch Ihor Kolomoyskyi (who was Governor of Dnipropetrovsk Oblast during the 2014 pro-Russian conflict in Ukraine) is believed to have spent $10 million to create the unit.

Commander of the unit Yuriy Bereza is since the 2014 Ukrainian parliamentary election a member of the Ukrainian parliament for the People's Front; he was placed 10th on the party's election list. Member of the unit Volodymyr Parasyuk was also elected into parliament during these elections by winning the electoral district of Yavoriv with 56.56% of the votes.

The unit was involved in the liberation of Lyman during the 2022 Russian invasion of Ukraine.

Human rights violations and war crimes 
 Reports (2016) published by the Office of the United Nations High Commissioner for Human Rights documented a worrying case of punitive damage to property in Donetsk by members of the armed groups targeting the house of a member of the Government-affiliated 'Dnipro-1' battalion. "On 20 January, a group of ‘Dnipro-1’ battalion members raided a house in Avdiivka, severely beating a man, subjecting him to asphyxiation with a plastic bag and mock execution."
 From the reports (2016) by Global Rights Compliance LLP: "For example, <UN Human Rights Monitoring Mission in Ukraine> has documented specific allegations of enforced disappearances, arbitrary detention and ill-treatment by the members of volunteer battalions such as "Aydar", "Dnipro-1", "Kyiv-1" and "Kyiv-2"; "The Volodymyr Kulmatytsky case gives rise to similar questions concerning the absence of war crimes charges. The accused persons in this case were charged with illegal confinement (Article 146(2)) and illegally handling arms (Article 263(1)). It is alleged that Mr Kulmatytsky, former deputy mayor of Sloviansk, was kidnapped by three soldiers and one commander (Mr. A) of the Battalion Dnipro-1 (Ukrainian police) and murdered later that day by Mr. A. Mr. A was informed that Mr. Kulmatytsky was involved in financing DPR formations".
 On 24 December 2014, Amnesty International reported that the unit was blocking humanitarian aid sent from Ukraine by another Ukrainian oligarch Rinat Akhmetov reaching the population in the separatist-controlled areas; over half the population in these areas depend on food aid. The reason the aid was being blocked by the Dnipro, Aidar and Donbas battalions is that the battalions "believe food and clothing are ending up in the wrong hands and may be sold instead of being given as humanitarian aid." Denis Krivosheev, acting Director of Europe and Central Asia for Amnesty International, stated that "using starvation of civilians as a method of warfare is a war crime".

References

External links 
 Volunteer detachments fighting in Donbas 

History of Donetsk Oblast
History of Dnipropetrovsk Oblast
Special tasks patrol police of Ukraine
Military units and formations established in 2014
2014 establishments in Ukraine